Maiara Regina Pereira Barreto (born 6 July 1987) is a Brazilian Paralympic swimmer who competes in international elite competitions. She is a double Parapan American Games silver medalist and has competed at the 2016 Summer Paralympics.

Career
Barreto became a paraplegic in 2009 after a motorcycle accident.

Personal life
Barreto is a pharmacist by training and a graduate of the University of São Paulo. Her capstone project assessed adverse effects of vancomycin use in a hospital setting.

References

1987 births
Living people
Brazilian pharmacists
People from Jacareí
Paralympic swimmers of Brazil
Swimmers at the 2016 Summer Paralympics
University of São Paulo alumni
Medalists at the World Para Swimming Championships
Medalists at the 2019 Parapan American Games
Women pharmacists
Brazilian female backstroke swimmers
Brazilian female breaststroke swimmers
S3-classified Paralympic swimmers
Sportspeople from São Paulo (state)
21st-century Brazilian women